The DJ 3 In The Mix is the third DJ mix compilation by German producer and remixer ATB, which was released on February 17, 2006. The DJ 3 is a double-CD album, and includes songs by various DJs and producers, all mixed and compiled by ATB.

Track listing

Disc 1
 ATB - Summer Rain (136 BPM Mix)
 Giuseppe Ottaviani - Linking People (Original Mix)
 Above & Beyond vs. Andy Moor - Air for Life (Original Mix)
 Tiësto - UR (Junkie XL Air Guitar Mix)
 Luminary - Amsterdam (Smith & Pledger Remix)
 Darren Tate - Dawn (Original Mix)
 Markus Schulz and Departure with Gabriel & Dresden - Without Your Near (Gabriel & Dresden Mix)
 Solarscape - Alive (Alucard Mix)
 Drax and Scott Mac - Must Have Been a Dream (Original Mix)
 Mark Norman - Touch Down (Original Mix)
 Jonas Steur - Silent Waves (Original Mix)
 Headstrong feat. Tiff Lacey - Close Your Eyes (Dwight Van Mann Remix)
 Carrie Skipper - Time Goes By (Super 8 Deep Mix)
 Marksun & Brian - Neno Itome (Original Mix)
 Lennox - Servant of Justice (Alex M.O.R.P.H. Remix)

Disc 2
 Ronski Speed and Sebastian Sand - Sole Survivor (Sebastian Sand Mix)
 Hidden Logic pres. Luminary - Wasting (Original Mix)
 Nalin and Kane - Open Your Eyes (The Child You Are) (Bush II Bush 2005 Remix)
 Shifted Reality - Fever (DJ3 Mix)
 Armin van Buuren feat. Nadia Ali - Who is Watching (Mischa Daniels Mix)
 Cressida - Certainty (Original Mix)
 ATB - Summer Rain (132 BPM Mix)
 Mirco de Govia - Vital Spark (Original Mix)
 Hiver & Hammer - Fusion 2006 (Funabashi Mix)
 Signalrunners - 3000 Miles Away (Probspot Club Mix)
 Nile - Ra (Original Mix)
 Alt + F4 - Alt + F4 (Original Mix)
 Alucard - Lighthouse (Original Mix)
 Funabashi - Daylight (Original Mix)

ATB albums
DJ mix albums
2006 compilation albums